Lake Rotokauri is located approximately 7 km to the northwest of Hamilton, New Zealand. It is a peat lake, and is one of the Waipa Peat lakes.

The lake has a maximum depth of four metres and the open water covers approximately 77 hectares. Lake Rotokauri drains into the Waipā River via the Ohote Stream.

The lake catchment area has a mixture of land uses including residential, industrial and pastoral.

Etymology
In Māori, rotokauri means "kauri lake".

See also 
 List of lakes of New Zealand

References 

Lakes of Waikato
Geography of Hamilton, New Zealand